Cruncher may refer to:

Jerry Cruncher, a character in the novel A Tale of Two Cities by Charles Dickens
Coban Lookchaomaesaitong (born 1966), Thai former Muay Thai kickboxer nicknamed "The Cruncher"
Larry Zbyszko (born 1951), American professional wrestler who called himself the "Cruncher"
Snickers Cruncher bar, a variation of the Snickers chocolate bar